Joi McMillon is an American film editor, known for her work on the Academy Award-winning film Moonlight (2016), for which she won several accolades.

Career 
McMillon initially planned to be a journalist, but a high school field trip to Universal Studios introduced her to the craft of editing and inspired her to apply to film school. She attended Florida State University College of Motion Picture Arts, graduating in 2003.

In 2017, she was nominated for an Academy Award for Best Film Editing (shared with Nat Sanders) at the 89th Academy Awards. McMillon is the first black woman to be nominated for an Oscar for film editing. Barry Jenkins said of her nomination in 2017: "I respect her work. It makes me very proud of the work she did to see that I'm not the only one. Clearly all these folks in the academy respected the work she did as well." McMillon also won (with Nat Sanders) Best Film Editing for her work on Moonlight at the 2017 Spirit Awards.

Filmography

Editor
 Blue Boy (Short, 2009)
 Shades of Gray (Short, 2009)
 Shoot the Moon (Short, 2009) 
 Chlorophyl (Short, 2011)
 The Other Side of Silence (Documentary, 2012) 
 The Radio Gamers (Short, 2013)
 Off-Season (Short, 2013) 
 SMILF (Short, 2015) 
 Anne & Jake (TV series) (7 episodes, 2015) 
 Girls (TV series) (1 episode, 2016) 
 Man Rots from the Head (Short, 2016) 
 Moonlight (2016)
 Lemon (2017)
 Hum (Short) (2017)
 American Woman (2018)
 If Beale Street Could Talk (2018)
 Zola (2020)
 The Underground Railroad (TV series) (2021)

Editorial department

 The Biggest Loser (TV series) (assistant editor - 5 episodes, 2004) 
 The Surreal Life (TV series) (assistant editor - 12 episodes, 2004)  
 Going Hollywood (TV series) (first assistant editor - 2005)  
 Beauty and the Geek (TV series) (first assistant editor - 15 episodes, 2005-2006) 
 The Sarah Silverman Program (TV series) (assistant editor - 5 episodes, 2007) (first assistant editor - 1 episode, 2007)  
 Talk to Me (apprentice editor, 2007)  
 Taking 5 (first assistant editor, 2007)  
 Judy's Got a Gun (TV Movie) (assistant editor, 2007)  
 Columbus Day (first assistant editor, 2008) 
 American Violet (first assistant editor, 2008)
 Not Easily Broken (first assistant editor, 2009)  
 I Can Do Bad All by Myself (first assistant editor, 2009)
 Why Did I Get Married Too? (first assistant editor, 2010) 
 Arcadia Lost (first assistant editor, 2010)  
 For Colored Girls (first assistant editor, 2010)  
 Madea's Big Happy Family (first assistant editor, 2011)
 Good Deeds (first assistant editor, 2012)  
 Madea's Witness Protection (assistant editor, 2012)  
 Temptation: Confessions of a Marriage Counselor (first assistant editor, 2013)   
 Wyatt Cenac: Brooklyn (TV Movie) (assistant editor, 2014)
 Togetherness (TV series) (assistant editor - 5 episodes, 2015) 
 Another Evil (additional editor, 2016)   
 Sausage Party (assistant editor: live action footage, 2016)   
 Mr. Church (first assistant editor, 2016)

Other credits
 Little Brown Boy (2003) (Short) 
 My Josephine (2003) (Short) 
 Straw Hat (2004) (Producer, Assistant Director)
 Medicine for Melancholy (2008) (special thanks)
 Sausage Party (2016) (special thanks)

Accolades

See also
 List of film director and editor collaborations

References

External links
 

Living people
American film editors
American Cinema Editors
African-American people
American women in film
American women film editors
Year of birth missing (living people)
21st-century American women